The Jim 'Frosty' Miller Medal is awarded to the Victorian Football League player who kicks the most goals in home-and-away matches in that year. The is named in honour of Jim 'Frosty' Miller, who was the leading goalkicker of the Victorian Football Association (predecessor to the Victorian Football League) on six occasions.

Jim 'Frosty' Miller Medal
The Jim Frosty Miller Medal has been awarded to the leading goalkicker across the home-and-away season since 1999. Nick Sautner currently holds the record for most medals, with nine.

VFA/VFL Leading Goalkicker (1877–1998)
This table lists the players recognised as VFA/VFL leading goalkicker prior to the establishment of the Frosty Miller Medal. Over this period, the leading goalkicker was recognised based on the complete season including finals matches (unlike the Frosty Miller Medal which considers home-and-away goals only). For the earliest period of the competition where there were no finals and teams played games against a mix of senior and junior opponents, the list below includes goals scored in all Victorian Football Association games (not just games against senior opponents).

Division 2 leading goalkickers
The following table shows the leading senior goalkicker in the VFA's second division (including finals), while it existed from 1961 until 1988.

References

External links
VFA/VFL Leading Goalkickers

Australian rules football awards
Victorian Football League